George Emile Rochon (May 24, 1892 – August 18, 1932) was a Canadian professional ice hockey player. He played in the Pacific Coast Hockey Association with the New Westminster Royals from 1912 to 1914. He played left wing.

References

External links
Statistics

1892 births
1932 deaths
Canadian ice hockey left wingers
Ice hockey people from Ontario
New Westminster Royals players
People from the United Counties of Prescott and Russell